Spinner Island is an island in Suisun Bay, an embayment of San Francisco Bay, downstream of the Sacramento–San Joaquin River Delta. It is part of Solano County, California, and not managed by any reclamation district. It is shown (but not labeled) in an 1850 survey map of the San Francisco Bay area made by Cadwalader Ringgold, as well as an 1854 map of the area by Henry Lange.

References

Islands of Solano County, California
Islands of the Sacramento–San Joaquin River Delta
Islands of Suisun Bay
Islands of Northern California